The Parish of Saint Nino in Paris is an Eastern Orthodox parish under the Ecumenical Patriarchate of Constantinople that comprises orthodox Christians of Georgian descent. It has been part of the Greek Orthodox Metropolis of France since 1977. The parish is named after Saint Nino.

It was founded in 1929 by Georgian refugees after the Red Army invaded their country.

The Georgian Orthodox Parish of Saint Nino in Paris, France, has relationship with Orthodox Church of Georgia but hierarchically depends on Ecumenical Patriarchate of Constantinople according to canon law.

History
 1922 : one thousand Georgian people (members of Parliament, of Government and of political parties) become refugees in France
 1929 : a committee (Ilamaz Dadeshkeliani, Josef Kemularia and Levan Zurabishvili) creates the Parish after validation by French authorities and the Ecumenical Patriarchate of Constantinople : the Saint Nino Eparchy at Paris depends on Metropolis of Thyateira (based in London)
 1977 : the Saint Nino Eparchy at Paris depends on Orthodox Metropolis of France (whose hierarch also presides the ).

Archpriests of Saint Nino
 1931-1942 : Grigol Peradze
 1943-1949 : Nikolas  Zabakhidze
 1949- 1988 : Elie Melia
 1988 : Gabriel Henry
 1988-1992 : Méthode Alexiou
 From 1992 : .

References

External links 
 (Georgian and French) Official site of Saint Nino Parish
   (French) La Paroisse orthodoxe géorgienne Sainte Nino de Paris

Eastern Orthodox dioceses in France
Georgian Orthodox Church
Eastern Orthodox church buildings in Paris
15th arrondissement of Paris
Christian organizations established in 1929
1929 establishments in France
Greek Orthodox Metropolis of France